Yacoub Shaheen (born 27 February 1994) is  a Palestinian singer from the West Bank city of Bethlehem. He is a Syriac Christian.

Shaheen won the TV program Arab Idol, a program with approximately 120 million viewers in the Arab World. He became the second Palestinian to win the contest after Mohammed Assaf who grew up in a Gaza Strip refugee camp and won the Arab Idol in 2013.

Biography 
Shaheen is mastering several musical instruments such as Bozouk, clarinet, and other rhythmic instruments. In 2005 he participated in the Palestinian Muhawm program. In October 2013, the young artist released his first song, "Human Spirit", composed by lyricist Elias Gres together with Yacoub. The song was recorded at RJ Productions in Bethlehem, And when his professional career as an artist began after the title of Arab Idol, he was accompanied by Awtar Band led by The Maestro Yacoub Al-Atrash in Arab and international festivals since then.

References 

Assyrian/Syriac Palestinians
1994 births
Living people
Palestinian Christians
Assyrian musicians
Syriac Orthodox Christians
Palestine Polytechnic University alumni